Stefan Meissner (born 8 March 1973) is a German former professional football who played as a forward. He spent one season in the Bundesliga with VfL Wolfsburg, as well as eight seasons in the 2. Bundesliga with Eintracht Braunschweig, Wolfsburg, Karlsruher SC, and Stuttgarter Kickers. Meissner had to retire from the game in 2006 due to a cartilage injury in his knee and currently works as an assistant coach at Bayern Munich U17.

Honours
 DFB-Pokal: runner-up 1994–95

References

External links
 

1973 births
Living people
People from Goslar (district)
Footballers from Lower Saxony
German footballers
German football managers
Germany under-21 international footballers
Association football forwards
Bundesliga players
2. Bundesliga players
Eintracht Braunschweig players
VfL Wolfsburg players
VfL Wolfsburg II players
Karlsruher SC players
Stuttgarter Kickers players
Chemnitzer FC players
West German footballers